G0/G1 switch 2 is a protein that in humans is encoded by the G0S2 gene.

References

Further reading 

Human proteins